Georgetown Airport or George Town Airport may refer to:
Penang International Airport (IATA: PEN), George Town, Penang, Malaysia
Owen Roberts International Airport (IATA: GCM), George Town, Cayman Islands
Cheddi Jagan International Airport (IATA: GEO), main airport serving Georgetown, Guyana
Eugene F. Correira International Airport (IATA: OGL), Georgetown, Guyana
Delaware Coastal Airport (IATA: GED), Georgetown, Delaware, United States
Georgetown Airport (Queensland) (IATA: GTT), Georgetown, Queensland, Australia
George Town Aerodrome (IATA: GEE), George Town, Tasmania, Australia
Georgetown Airport (California) (FAA: E36), Georgetown, California, United States
Georgetown-Scott County Airport (FAA: 27K), Georgetown, Kentucky, United States
Maurice Bishop International Airport (IATA: GND), St. Georges, Grenada
Exuma International Airport (IATA: GGT), main airport serving George Town, Exuma, Bahamas
George Town Airport (ICAO: MYEG), George Town, Exuma, Bahamas
Georgetown Municipal Airport (ICAO: KGTU), Georgetown, Texas, United States